The United States Curling Association Hall of Fame was started in 1984 to recognize and honor individuals and teams that have achieved extraordinary distinction in curling or have made major contribution to the development of curling in the United States. It is operated by the United States Curling Association (USCA), the governing body for curling in the United States. The Hall of Fame is housed at the USCA headquarters in Stevens Point, Wisconsin.

There have been 45 individuals and 4 teams inducted into the Hall of Fame. 

The first inductee was Bud Somerville, 2-time world champion and 2-time Olympian. Somerville is also included as skip of two of the four teams to have been inducted to the Hall of Fame, the 1965 World Men's Championship team and the 1975 World Men's Championship team. The other two teams that have been inducted are the 1976 World Men's Championship team and the 1978 World Men's Championship team.

The Hall of Fame selection committee meets annually to choose inductees. Inductees are categorized into one of three categories: Curler recognizes an individual or team for their competitive success, Builder recognizes an individual for their contribution to curling in the United States, or Curler/Builder which recognizes an individual who has combined the two previous categories.

Members

References

External links 

 

Curling in the United States
Curling trophies and awards
Halls of fame in Wisconsin
Sports halls of fame
1984 establishments in the United States
Awards established in 1984